Yeung Chi Ka (born 6 November 1988) is a Hong Kong retired para table tennis player. She won a silver medal at the 2012 Summer Paralympics.

Yeung has an intellectual disability.

References

1988 births
Living people
Hong Kong female table tennis players
Table tennis players at the 2012 Summer Paralympics
Paralympic medalists in table tennis
Paralympic silver medalists for Hong Kong
Medalists at the 2012 Summer Paralympics
Sportspeople with intellectual disability
Paralympic table tennis players of Hong Kong
21st-century Hong Kong women